Toseland may refer to:

 Toseland, Cambridgeshire, a village in England

People with the surname
 David Toseland, English cricketer
 Ernie Toseland, English footballer 
 Geoff Toseland (1931–2019), English footballer
 James Toseland, English motorcycle racer